is a Japanese women's professional shogi player ranked 3-dan.

Promotion history
Iwane's promotion history  is as follows.
 1-kyū: April 1, 2004
 1-dan: April 1, 2005
 2-dan: March 9, 2009
 3-dan: February 22, 2016

Note: All ranks are women's professional ranks.

Titles and other championships
Iwane has appeared in major title matches three times, but has yet to win a major title. She was the challenger for the 2nd  title in 2009, the 18th  title in 2010 and the 27th  title in 2016, but lost each time.

Awards and honors
Iwane received the Japan Shogi Association's Annual Shogi Award for "Women's Professional Most Games Played" for the April 2009March 2010 shogi year.

References

External links
 ShogiHub: Professional Player Info · Shinobu Iwane
 blog: お気楽ブログ

Japanese shogi players
Women's professional shogi players
Professional shogi players from Osaka Prefecture
Living people
1981 births
People from Osaka